(lit. 'The Gospel of the Eel. The Story of the World's Most Enigmatic Fish') is a 2019 book written by Swedish journalist and author Patrik Svensson. It won the 2019 August Prize for Non-Fiction.

The book, which is partly non-fiction because it tackles about the eel as a species and about the eel's cultural history, also has an autobiographical story about the author's relationship with his father.

References

Swedish non-fiction books 
Swedish-language novels
Swedish non-fiction literature
August Prize-winning works
Albert Bonniers Förlag books